Choco Bank (Hangul: 초코 뱅크) is a South Korean web series created by Cheil Worldwide Inc. for the Financial Services Commission (FSC). It consists of six episodes about the financial management of start up businesses. The web drama recorded 2,519,849 views in the week of February 15 to February 21, 2016, according to cons TV.

Background 
Choco Bank is about a man named Kim Eun-haeng (Kim Jong-in), a college graduate entering the workforce. His father made sure he had a lucky start in life by giving him a name that means "bank" in Korean. He will deal with the concerns with which many in their 20s struggle when they start working for the first time. He was unemployed for five years. He later meets a girl named Ha Cho-co (Park Eun-bin) who is preparing to start a business. The story plays out as the two find out more about the financial service industry.

Cast 
Kim Jong-in as Kim Eun-haeng
Park Eun-bin as Ha Cho-co / Byun Mal-nyeon
Park Seo-yeon as young Mal-nyeon
Yeon Joon-seok as Bae Dal-soo
 Choi Min-young as young Dal-soo
Lee Il-hwa as Eun-haeng's mother
Lee Chae-won as Hong Chae-ri
Kim Young-hee as Cho-co's landlord
Kim Sook as Worker at Financial Bank

Original soundtracks

Awards and nominations

References

External links 
Naver TV cast

Choco Bank at Daum Movie

2016 web series debuts
2016 web series endings
South Korean drama web series
Naver TV original programming
Cheil Worldwide